is a Japanese erotic visual novel and adventure game developed by Apricot and published by CrossNet, released on July 25, 2003 for Windows. The game was later ported to the PlayStation 2 by HuneX and published by Kadokawa Shoten on March 31, 2005; adapted into a two-episode animated series by Image House and localized in North America by Critical Mass, and in Australia by Siren Visual. A sequel, Maple Colors 2, was released in 2008.

Gameplay

Unlike the formula of most visual novels, which are noted for their minimal interaction, Maple Colors is slightly different in that it combines elements of an adventure game with that of interactive fiction. Though reasonably limited, players control chibi versions of characters, able to travel around isometric maps, perform tasks, collect items and even participate in mini-games. In a more recognizable fashion, players watch and listen to sequences of story and then select choosable actions or responses when they are presented. As choices are intricately linked to alternating routes of plot, the direction of the story is changed, leading to erotic scenes between characters and ultimately one of various endings. In order for the player to watch all the possible endings in this regard, he or she will have to effectively replay through the game several times, all the while making different selections.

Plot

Yoshijirou Saku is a young Japanese transfer student of the fictional Kouka Academy, an institution renowned for its theatre. A rebel by virtue of his delinquency, Saku and schoolmate Mirai Aoi are wrongfully held responsible for a fight when they come to the aggressive aid of a defenseless student being bullied; faculty members ruling to expel them and their disorderly class. Yukihito Aizen, the respected though contemptible head of the drama club, with eyes set on Mirai, proposes a commutation requiring the offenders to enlist their entire class in a play or else face expulsion.

Characters

Yoshijirou Saku is the unlikely protagonist of the series. A recent second-year transfer student, his life takes an unexpected turn when he is blamed for fighting and threatened with expulsion, along with classmate Mirai Aoi. Given the chance to redress his actions, Yoshijirou is assigned to recruit his entire class, a notorious group of disobedient misfits, to perform in a play lest having to leave school permanently with them.

Loud and headstrong, Mirai Aoi is a second-year student and the most iconic character of the series. Known among her class by the nickname "Captain", Mirai is a temperamental, fastidious leader, determined to combat the ridicule and undermining she and her group regularly receive from the rest of the school. An accomplice by association, Mirai is required to assist Yoshijirou in appropriating their class for the play; a task she grows to respect and admire him for.

Momiji Aio is a second-year student, recognizable by her long pink hair and flamboyant wardrobe; aspiring to be a playwright and director. A short, friendly girl, Momiji is meek and easily intimidated by nature; on stage, a serious and capable actress. She is good friends with Mirai.

Distant and reserved, Sora Suzuhara is a second-year student who is also on the swim team. With a preference for solitude and disinterest in others, Sora is antisocial, nihilistic, mysterious, and deadpan. Through her acquaintance with Yoshijirou however, Sora becomes emotional, open and appreciative.

Amu Uzuki is an adolescent entertainer, actress and celebrity, widely known and recognized across Japan for her acting, affluence, and looks. She visits Kouka Academy in response to the play being arranged and offers to participate in it; taking a fondness for Yoshijirou. In spite of the fame and fortune she commands, her classist family, constant traveling, few friends and nonexistent love life take a toll on her.

Direct and quiet, Motoko Sakimori is a second-year student who doubles as the local Shinto shrine miko. She is recognized for donning her robes in place of a school uniform, serious, tough-love attitude, nage-waza martial arts and purple hair. In a fashion similar to Sora, Motoko opens up around Yoshijirou, showing a less seen, tender side of her; one including an affection for anything cute.

Youko Momoi is a second-year student who is on the girls' softball team as an ace pitcher. A friendly though clumsy girl, Youko is easily intimidated, buckles under pressure and struggles with theatre. Of all the characters that appear in the game, Youko is the only one bespectacled female.

Casts 
 Yoshijirou Saku - Hikaru Midorikawa
 Mirai Aoi - Hitomi
 Momiji Aio - Ayaka Kimura
 Sora Suzuhara - Akane Tomonaga
 Amu Uzuki - Momoka Usami
 Motoko Sakimori - Ruru
 Youko Momoi - Ooonami
 Mirin Kazuki - Kasumi Touno
 Yumi Sakanakura - Seiko Ikuina
 Makoto Sakura - Kohiro Fukumoto
 Maki Sanebara - Sayuki Haruno
 Hijiri Takano - Kyouko Hirano
 Kanata Tanaka - Haruka Nagami
 Yato Chikumagawa - Ai Kawano
 Chika Natsume - Miya Serizono
 Yoriko Niyou - Pochi Uchino
 Minori Baba - Rin Miyabi
 Konoha Hayashi - Yuki Kajita
 Momo Momochi - Asuka Misono
 Akira Yamagata - Ren Kashiwakura
 Chikara Ohkubo - Yūsuke Kazami
 Atsushi Onikojima - Kenji Nojima
 Nayuta Kuon - Yukimatsu Yoshi
 Kojirou Koishi - Kazunari Tanaka
 Kochi Shinonome - Shin Shōin
 Kimonobu Hattori - Kazunari Tanaka
 Itaru Hebime - Michael Shitanda
 Junichi Migata - Mari Oda
 Kouzukenosuke Mimasaka - Hiroshi Sato
 Getarou Memekura - Ai Kawano
 Tarou Yamada - Tomokazu Sugita
 Kanako Sakamoto - Mari Oda
 Shinobu Watarai - Rin Miyabi
 Tetsuko Iwata - Asuka Misono
 Yumeko Jinguuji - Shiho Kawaragi
 Yukihito Aizen - Tomokazu Sugita
 Hiiko Osugi - Hiroshi Sato
 Chibi - Kenji Nojima
 Debu - Michael Shitanda

Development

Maple Colors was officially announced via its website going live on January 15, 2003; character profiles released same day. On January 29, CrossNet reported that it would be releasing a public, downloadable benchmark of the game on February 1; this was postponed until February 3 the day after. Despite this, the trial was actually released on February 4; select participants were additionally awarded game merchandise.

After updating the game website with additional screenshots, CrossNet announced that Maple Colors would be released on July 18 on May 22. The site was revamped on May 30, followed by more screenshots, a sample of the opening video and theme "Breakthrough Your Heart" by Yuria, and then additional screenshots from June 6 to 9. On June 11, after announcing the voice actors working on the project, CrossNet stated that Maple Colors had been postponed until July 25. The day after, CrossNet announced that it was hosting a public venue to showcase the game in Akihabara from June 13 to 14. This was followed by subsequent updates to the game site from June 18 to July 1.

Two days later, on July 3, CrossNet scheduled another venue for July 11 and 12 in Akihabara and Osaka. With the release date readily approaching, CrossNet announced on July 7 that it would be hosting a celebratory event; confirming that the July 25 date was unchanged. As final commercial endeavors, the complete soundtrack of the game was released on September 26 by Lantis; a radio drama following on October 22.

Patches

On July 24, 2003, the day before Maple Colors was released, a series of debilitating bugs were discovered. That same day, CrossNet announced that it was developing a patch to address the issues in time for the release. The following day the patch went live, downloadable from the official game website, bringing the game up to version 1.11. Despite the effort, two more patches were developed to supplement the previous patches as well as address newly discovered bugs, bringing the game up to a stable version of 1.11β.

Reception

Maple Colors was met with mixed reception, ranking 28 out of 50 on Getchu.com for the year of its release. Maple Colors H, a gaiden released on January 30, 2004, fared better, ranking 4 out of 20 for the month of its release, 16 for the month of February, and 40 out of 50 for the overall year. Maple Colors: Kessen ha Gakuen Matsuri!, according to the July 2004 issue of Famitsu.

References

External links
Official website 

2003 video games
2004 anime OVAs
Eroge
Harem anime and manga
Harem video games
Japan-exclusive video games
Video games developed in Japan
Windows games
Windows-only games
HuneX games